Elise Romba (born 11 July 1997 in Villefontaine) is a French professional squash player. As of February 2018, she was ranked number 109 in the world.

References

1997 births
Living people
French female squash players